Cloacina is a genus of parasitic nematodes in the family Chabertiidae. Species are parasites of marsupials in Australia.

Selected species 
 Cloacina annulata
 Cloacina atthis
 Cloacina caenis
 Cloacina castor
 Cloacina cloelia
 Cloacina clymene
 Cloacina communis
 Cloacina edwardsi
 Cloacina elegans 
 Cloacina eos
 Cloacina ernabella
 Cloacina gallardi
 Cloacina hydriformis
 Cloacina io
 Cloacina liebigi
 Cloacina mawsonae
 Cloacina papillata
 Cloacina papillatissima
 Cloacina parva
 Cloacina pearsoni
 Cloacina petrogale
 Cloacina pollux
 Cloacina robertsi
 Cloacina similis
 Cloacina wallabiae

References 

 New species and new records of Cloacina von Linstow, 1898 (Nematoda: Strongyloidea) parasitic in macropodid marsupials from Papua New Guinea. I Beveridge - Records of the South Australian Museum, 2002
 New species of Cloacina Linstow, 1898 (Nematoda: Strongyloidea) parasitic in the stomach of the quokka, Setonix brachyurus (Marsupialia: Macropodidae). I Beveridge - Transactions of the Royal Society of South Australia, 1999

External links 

 
 Cloacina at gbif.org
 Cloacina at the Interim Register of Marine and Nonmarine Genera (IRMNG)

Strongylida
Rhabditida genera
Parasitic nematodes of mammals
Parasites of marsupials